Runshaw Hall is a grade II listed 19th-century country house in Runshaw Hall Lane, Euxton, Chorley, Lancashire, England, which has been converted into apartments. It is surrounded by parkland containing a pond and woodland.

The hall is an italianate rectangular two-storey building built of red brick with yellow stone dressing and a hipped slate roof. There are 6 bays along the longer side and 3 along the shorter. 

In earlier times a previous property belonged successively to the Lancasters of Rainhill and the Farnworth family, who vacated the hall c.1747 on the death of Edward Farnworth.  The current house was built in 1862 and was acquired by William Bretherton. On his death in 1890 it passed to his second son Norris Bretherton (1860–1924). Before and after the Second World War it was a run by the Brothers of Charity as a Residential Home for mentally challenged young men, after which it served as a restaurant in the 1970s. After a fire it was converted to an apartment complex.

References

Country houses in Lancashire
Grade II listed buildings in Lancashire
Italianate architecture in England
Buildings and structures in the Borough of Chorley
1862 establishments in England
Grade II listed houses